Tugai may refer to:

Tugay, a  form of riparian forest or woodland
Tǔgǎi, Chinese abbreviation for Land Reform Movement (China)
Theodor Antonius Tugai (1912 –  2000), better known as Teuvo Tulio, Finnish film director and actor
Mohamed Amine Tougai, Algerian footballer

See also

Tugay (disambiguation)